Shipton is an unincorporated community in Saline County, Kansas, United States.  It is located northwest of Salina about 0.75 miles west of the intersection of Halstead Road and Shipton Road, next to an abandoned railroad.

History
The post office in Shipton was discontinued in 1895.

Education
The community is served by Ell-Saline USD 307 public school district.

References

Further reading

External links
 Saline County maps: Current, Historic, KDOT

Unincorporated communities in Saline County, Kansas
Unincorporated communities in Kansas